Qualcomm Krait is an ARM-based central processing unit included in the Snapdragon S4 and earlier models of Snapdragon 400/600/800 series SoCs. It was introduced in 2012 as a successor to the Scorpion CPU and although it has architectural similarities, Krait is not a Cortex-A15 core, but it was designed in-house. In 2015, Krait was superseded by the 64-bit Kryo architecture, first introduced in Snapdragon 820 SoC.

Overview 

 11 stage integer pipeline with 3-way decode and 4-way out-of-order speculative issue superscalar execution
 Pipelined VFPv4 and 128-bit wide NEON (SIMD)
 7 execution ports
 4 KB + 4 KB direct mapped L0 cache
 16 KB + 16 KB 4-way set associative L1 cache
 1 MB (dual-core) or 2 MB (quad-core) 8-way set-associative L2 cache
 Dual or quad-core configurations
 Performance (DMIPS/MHz):
 Krait 200: 3.3 (28 nm LP)
 Krait 300: 3.39 (28 nm LP)
 Krait 400: 3.39 (28 nm HPm)
 Krait 450: 3.51 (28 nm HPm)

See also 
 Scorpion (CPU)
 Kryo (microarchitecture)
 Comparison of ARMv7-A cores
List of Qualcomm Snapdragon processors

References

External links
 Qualcomm's Snapdragon S4 Site.

ARM processors
Qualcomm IP cores